Abdullah Al-Oaisher (born May 13, 1991) is a Saudi football player who plays for Al-Ettifaq as a goalkeeper.

Career statistics

Club

Honours

Club
Al-Fateh
Saudi Professional League: 2012–13
Saudi Super Cup: 2013

Al-Nassr
Saudi Professional League: 2018–19

References

External links 
 

1991 births
Living people
People from Al-Hasa
Association football goalkeepers
Saudi Arabian footballers
Saudi Arabia international footballers
Al-Fateh SC players
Al Nassr FC players
Ohod Club players
Al-Shabab FC (Riyadh) players
Al-Wehda Club (Mecca) players
Ettifaq FC players
Saudi Professional League players
Saudi Arabian Shia Muslims